Malcolm Day (born 6 November 1964) is an Australian businessman and mining surveyor, who is the Managing Director of publicly listed company Moab Minerals (ASX: MOM) in Perth, Western Australia.

References

1964 births
Living people
Australian businesspeople
Curtin University alumni